Oscar Peter (born June 11, 1981) is a Swiss former competitive figure skater. As a single skater, he is a six-time Swiss national medalist, winning silver from 1998–2000 and bronze from 2001–2003. He took up ice dancing in 2003 and teamed up with Leonie Krail. Together, they became three-time Swiss national champions (2006, 2008, 2009) and competed in the final segment at four ISU Championships – 2006 Europeans, 2008 Europeans, 2009 Europeans, and 2008 Worlds. They were coached by Natalia Linichuk and Gennadi Karponosov in Aston, Pennsylvania.

As of 2016, Peter is working as a skating coach and choreographer in the UK and around Europe.

Programs 
(with Krail)

Competitive highlights

Ice dancing with Krail

Single skating 
JGP: Junior Grand Prix

References

External links
 
 
 

Swiss male ice dancers
Swiss male single skaters
1981 births
Living people
People from Santiago de los Caballeros
Swiss people of Dominican Republic descent
Sportspeople of Dominican Republic descent